Nuclease S1 is an endonuclease enzyme that splits single-stranded DNA (ssDNA) and RNA into oligo- or mononucleotides. This enzyme catalyses the following chemical reaction

 Endonucleolytic cleavage to 5'-phosphomononucleotide and 5'-phosphooligonucleotide end-products

Although its primary substrate is single-stranded, it can also occasionally introduce single-stranded breaks in double-stranded DNA or RNA, or DNA-RNA hybrids. The enzyme hydrolyses single stranded region in duplex DNA such as loops or gaps.  It also cleaves a strand opposite a nick on the complementary strand. It has no sequence specificity.

Well-known versions include S1 found in Aspergillus oryzae (yellow koji mold) and Nuclease P1 found in Penicillium citrinum. Members of the S1/P1 family are found in both prokaryotes and eukaryotes and are thought to be associated in programmed cell death and also in tissue differentiation. Furthermore, they are secreted extracellular, that is, outside of the cell. Their function and distinguishing features mean they have potential in being exploited in the field of biotechnology.

Nomenclature
Alternative names include endonuclease S1 (Aspergillus), single-stranded-nucleate endonuclease, deoxyribonuclease S1, deoxyribonuclease S1, Aspergillus nuclease S1, Neurospora crassa single-strand specific endonuclease, S1 nuclease, single-strand endodeoxyribonuclease, single-stranded DNA specific endonuclease, single-strand-specific endodeoxyribonuclease, single strand-specific DNase and Aspergillus oryzae S1 nuclease.

Structure 
Most nucleases with EC 3.1.30.1 activity are homologous to each other in a protein domain family called Nuclease S1/P1.

Members of this family, including P1 and S1, are glycoproteins with very distinguishing features, they are:
 a requirement for three zinc ions cofactors,
 containing common active site motifs and
 requires an acidic pH for catalysis.
 contains three glycans bound to the amino acid asparagine via N-glycosylation
 two Disulphide bridges between cysteine residues.
These requirements and distinguishing features are responsible for function efficacy. It is an enzyme and these four features are needed for enzyme functionality. The three zinc ions  are vital for catalysis. The first two zincs activate the attacking water in hydrolysis whilst the third zinc ion stabilizes the leaving oxyanion.

Properties

Aspergillus nuclease S1 is a monomeric protein of a molecular weight of 38 kilodalton. It requires Zn2+ as a cofactor and is relatively stable against denaturing agents like urea, SDS, or formaldehyde. The optimum pH for its activity lies between 4-4.5. Aspergillus nuclease S1 is known to be inhibited somewhat by 50 μM ATP and nearly completely by 1 mM ATP. 50% inhibition has been shown at 85 μM dAMP and  1 μM dATP but uninhibited by cAMP.

Mechanism
This zinc-dependent nuclease protein domain produces 5' nucleotides and cleaves phosphate groups from 3' nucleotides. Additionally, the side chain of tryptophan located in the cavity
in the active site and its backbone supports the action  one of the zinc ions. Such mechanisms are essential to the catalytic function of the enzyme.

Uses
Aspergillus nuclease S1 is used in the laboratory as a reagent in nuclease protection assays. In molecular biology, it is used in removing single stranded tails from DNA molecules to create blunt ended molecules and opening hairpin loops generated during synthesis of double stranded cDNA.

See also 
 Mung bean nuclease, similar activity but probably not homologous
 DNA/RNA non-specific endonuclease, non-homologous family with similar DNA/RNA activity but accepts double-stranded substrate better

References

Further reading 

 

Zinc enzymes
EC 3.1.30
Nucleases
Protein domains
Protein families